Kimball is a hamlet in southern Alberta, Canada within Cardston County. The community is named after the Mormon ward which was named after the descendants of Heber C Kimball.

Demographics 
The population of Kimball according to the 2008 municipal census conducted by Cardston County is 26.

See also 
List of communities in Alberta
List of hamlets in Alberta
List of provincial historic sites of Alberta

References

External links 
 History of Kimball
 History of Woolford

Cardston County
Hamlets in Alberta
Latter-day Saint settlements in Canada
1900 establishments in the Northwest Territories